East Vistas is an unincorporated community in central Alberta, Canada within Leduc County.

History 
Approved by Leduc County Council on September 28, 2010, East Vistas will be an urban community with a population of approximately 22,549 people at full build-out. It currently consists of two existing residential subdivisions – Lukas Estates (formerly Lukas Estates I), an estate residential subdivision, and Diamond Estates (formerly Lukas Estates II), a large lot urban subdivision.

The approval of East Vistas has provided Leduc County the opportunity to develop its own large urban community, similar to how Strathcona County has Sherwood Park.

Geography 
More specifically, East Vistas includes all lands bound by Highway 625 to the south, Range Road 244 to the east, Township Road 510 to the north, and Range Road 245 to the west. It also includes lands on the west side of Range Road 245 between The Vistas country residential subdivisions to the south and Irvine Creek and Township Road 510 to the north.

Demographics 

See also 
Bremner, Alberta, a future urban community in Strathcona County endorsed in 2016

References 

Designated places in Alberta
Leduc County
Unincorporated communities in Alberta